Vernier is a French surname. Notable people with the surname include:

Cédric Vernier (born 1975), French footballer
Émile Louis Vernier (1829–1887), French painter
Marie Vernier (fl. 1590–1627), French actress and theatre director
Pierre Vernier (1580–1637), French mathematician and engineer
Pierre Vernier (born 1931), French actor

French-language surnames